Anthene lychnides, the brown ciliate blue, is a butterfly in the family Lycaenidae. It is found in southern Nigeria and western Cameroon. The habitat probably consists of forests.

References

Butterflies described in 1878
Anthene
Butterflies of Africa
Taxa named by William Chapman Hewitson